Digna Ketelaar (born 13 August 1967) is a former Dutch tennis player. She won one ITF doubles title during her career and on 2 March 1987 reached a singles ranking high of world number 258. On 21 December 1986, Ketelaar reached a doubles ranking high of world number 174.

As a junior, Ketelaar became the 1984 French Open girls' doubles champion.

ITF doubles finals (1–2)

See also 
 List of French Open champions

External links 
 
 
 

1967 births
Living people
Dutch female tennis players
French Open junior champions
Grand Slam (tennis) champions in girls' doubles
People from Halderberge
Sportspeople from North Brabant
20th-century Dutch women